A small-c conservative is anyone who believes in the philosophy of conservatism but does not necessarily identify with an official Conservative Party. The word "conservative" is used in lower case as the word refers to general conservatism principles and not as a proper noun, as in a political Conservative Party.

Context

Canadian
The term was especially popular in Canada during the 1990s when the Progressive Conservative Party was centre-right with the Reform Party (later, the Canadian Alliance) further to the right. Members and supporters of the Reform Party/Canadian Alliance would thus describe themselves as small-c conservatives.

British
This term is also used in the United Kingdom to describe those who are conservative in the sense of resisting radical change rather than being members or supporters of the official Conservative Party. For example, the House of Lords as a body tends to resist social change and executive power and therefore—regardless of the numbers of lords who take the Conservative party whip—it is described as "small-c conservative".

Australian

A small-c conservative in Australia is generally a member of the Liberal Party who is more moderate on social policy and conservative on fiscal policy. The Liberal Party is made up of such small-c conservatives as well as the more right-wing big-C conservatives.

References

See also 
Small-l liberalism
Small-l libertarianism
Blue Tory
Red Tory

Conservatism